David James Hudson (December 16, 1943 – May 21, 2011) was an American sound engineer. He was nominated for three Academy Awards in the category Best Sound.

Selected filmography
 Star Trek IV: The Voyage Home (1986)
 Beauty and the Beast (1991)
 Aladdin (1992)

References

External links

 

1943 births
2011 deaths
American audio engineers
Primetime Emmy Award winners
Place of birth missing
Walt Disney Animation Studios people